Hechavarría is a Basque surname. It is an alternative Castilianized spelling of modern Basque Etxeberria. Notable people with this name include:

Adeiny Hechavarria (born 1989), Cuban baseball player
Bárbara Hechavarría (born 1966), Cuban discus thrower
Cariola Hechavarría (born 1976), Cuban basketball player

Basque-language surnames